Melissa Holanda Gurgel (born June 3, 1994) is a Brazilian designer, model and beauty pageant titleholder who was crowned Miss Brasil 2014 and represented her country at Miss Universe 2014.

Early life
Gurgel is working as model and majoring in fashion and design studies.

Pageantry

Miss Brasil 2014
Gurgel was crowned as Miss Brasil 2014 and represented Ceará. The 60th annual Miss Brasil pageant was held at Centro de Eventos do Ceará, Fortaleza, on September 27, 2014. Meanwhile, at the same event Miss São Paulo and Miss Rio Grande de Norte were crowned as the runners-up respectively. The 2nd Runner-up, Deise Benício of Rio Grande do Norte competed at Miss International 2014.

Miss Universe 2014
Gurgel represented her country in the Miss Universe 2014 pageant where she placed among the Top 15.

References

External links
Miss Brasil pageant official site

1994 births
Living people
Brazilian beauty pageant winners
Brazilian female models
Miss Universe 2014 contestants
People from Ceará
Miss Brazil winners